Pernet is a French surname. Notable people with the surname include:

André Pernet (1894–1966), French opera singer
Diane Pernet, French fashion designer
Étienne Pernet (1824–1899), founder of the Little Sisters of the Assumption Order
Heinz Pernet, German-born Nazi Party leader
Jean Pernet, père (1832–1896), French rosarian
Joseph Pernet-Ducher (1859–1928), French rosarian

French-language surnames